Events from the year 1931 in the United States.

Incumbents

Federal Government 
 President: Herbert Hoover (R-California)
 Vice President: Charles Curtis (R-Kansas)
 Chief Justice: Charles Evans Hughes (New York)
 Speaker of the House of Representatives: Nicholas Longworth (R-Ohio) (until March 4), John Nance Garner (D-Texas) (starting December 7)
 Senate Majority Leader: James Eli Watson (R-Indiana)
 Congress: 71st (until March 4), 72nd (starting March 4)

Events

January
 January – The American Federation of Labor's National Committee for Modification of the Volstead Act is formed to work for the repeal of Prohibition in the United States.
 January 2 – South Dakota native Ernest Lawrence invents the cyclotron, used to accelerate particles to study nuclear physics.
 January 3 – Albert Einstein begins doing research at the California Institute of Technology, along with astronomer Edwin Hubble.
 January 6 
 Thomas Edison submits his last patent application.
  In Chicago, CBMC hosts the first meeting to address a greater purpose for business during The Great Depression; over 800 people attend the meeting, in Chicago's Garrick Theatre.

February
 Food riots break out in Minneapolis and other parts of the United States.
 February 14 – The original film version of Dracula, with Bela Lugosi, is released in the United States.
 February 20 – California gets the go-ahead by the U.S. Congress to build the San Francisco–Oakland Bay Bridge.

March
 March 1 – Battleship USS Arizona is placed back in full commission after a refit.
 March 3 – The Star-Spangled Banner is adopted as the United States national anthem.
 March 17 – Nevada legalizes gambling.
 March 25 – The Scottsboro Boys are arrested in Alabama and charged with sexual activity.

April
 April 1 – Canyon de Chelly National Monument is established.
 April 15 – The Castellemmarese War ends with the assassination of Joe "The Boss" Masseria, briefly leaving Salvatore Maranzano as capo di tutti i capi ("boss of all bosses") and undisputed ruler of the American Mafia. Maranzano is himself assassinated less than 6 months later, leading to the establishment of the Five Families.
 April 18 – Cheverly, Maryland is incorporated.
 April 22 – The U.S., Austria, United Kingdom, Denmark, Germany, Italy and Sweden recognize the Spanish Republic.

May

 May 1 – Construction of the Empire State Building is completed in New York City.
 May 7 – "Siege of West 91st Street": 18-year-old serial murderer Francis "Two Gun" Crowley surrenders after a 2-hour gun battle with New York City Police Department witnessed by 15,000 bystanders.
 May 20 – Lake of the Ozarks completed.

June
 June 1 – New York City Fire Department Rescue 3 is put in service for service in the Bronx and above 116th Street (Manhattan). Rescue 4 is founded the same day for Queens
 June 19 – In an attempt to stop the banking crisis in Central Europe from causing a worldwide financial meltdown, President Herbert Hoover issues the Hoover Moratorium.
 June 23 – Wiley Post and Harold Gatty take off from Roosevelt Field, Long Island in an attempt to accomplish the first round-the-world flight in a single-engine plane.

July
 July – John Haven Emerson of Cambridge, Massachusetts, perfects the Emerson iron lung just in time for the growing polio epidemic.
 July 26 – The International Bible Students Association  adopts the name Jehovah's Witnesses at a convention in Columbus, Ohio.

August
 Warner Brothers releases the first Merrie Melodies cartoon, Lady, Play Your Mandolin.
 August 16 – Texas experiences an earthquake with a moment magnitude of 6.5, the most powerful earthquake in its recorded history.

September
 September – Construction of Rockefeller Center on Manhattan begins.

October
 October – The Caltech Department of Physics Faculty and graduate students meet with Albert Einstein as a guest.
 October 4 – Dick Tracy, the comic strip detective character created by cartoonist Chester Gould, makes his first appearance in the Detroit Mirror newspaper.
 October 10 – The St. Louis Cardinals defeat the Philadelphia Athletics, 4 games to 3, to win their second World Series title in baseball.
 October 17 – American gangster Al Capone is sentenced to 11 years in prison for tax evasion in Chicago.
 October 24 – The George Washington Bridge across the Hudson River is dedicated; it opens to traffic the following day. At , it nearly doubles the previous record for the longest main span in the world.

November
 November 10 – The 4th Academy Awards, hosted by Lawrence Grant, are presented at Biltmore Hotel in Los Angeles, with William LeBaron's Cimarron winning the Academy Award for Best Picture. The film also receives the most nominations and awards, with seven and three respectively. Norman Taurog wins Best Director for Skippy.
 November 21 – James Whale's film of Frankenstein is released in New York City.
 November 26 – Deuterium is discovered by Harold Urey.

December
 December 10 – Jane Addams becomes the first American woman to be awarded the Nobel Peace Prize.
 December 12 – The Eta chapter of Kappa Delta Phi is founded at The University of Maine at Machias.
 December 26 – Phi Iota Alpha, the oldest surviving Latino fraternity, is founded.
 December – Ess Bee Dress Company is incorporated.

Undated
 Elizabeth Dilling begins anti-communist activism.
 Park Hill Golf Club located in Denver, Colorado, is established.
 The Association for Research and Enlightenment, Inc. (ARE) founded in Virginia Beach, Virginia, as an open-membership group to research the collected transcripts of Edgar Cayce's continuing trances, stored at the Edgar Cayce Foundation.

Ongoing
 Lochner era (c. 1897–c. 1937)
 U.S. occupation of Haiti (1915–1934)
 Prohibition (1920–1933)
 Great Depression (1929–1933)
 Dust Bowl (1930–1936)

Births

January

 January 1 – Bobbie Nelson, pianist and singer (d. 2022)
 January 5
 Alvin Ailey, choreographer (d. 1989)
 Robert Duvall, actor and director 
 January 6
 Fern Battaglia, baseball player (d. 2001)
 E. L. Doctorow, novelist (d. 2015)
 January 7 – Mack Mattingly, U.S. Senator from Georgia from 1981 to 1987
 January 10 – Ron Galella, photographer (d. 2022)
 January 16 – Ellen Holly, actress
 January 17 – James Earl Jones, African-American actor
 January 20
 Jack Grinnage, actor 
 Preston Henn, businessman, founder of Fort Lauderdale Swap Shop (d. 2017)
 David Lee, physicist, recipient of the Nobel Prize in Physics in 1996
 January 22 – Sam Cooke, African-American singer (d. 1964)
 January 25 – Dean Jones, actor (d. 2015)
 January 27 – Red Bastien, wrestler, trainer and promoter (d. 2012)
 January 29 – Jim Baumer, baseball player and manager (d. 1996)
 January 30 – Allan W. Eckert, American historian, naturalist, and author (d. 2011)
 January 31 
 Ernie Banks, African-American baseball player (d. 2015)
 Lorraine Ellison, African-American soul singer (d. 1983)
 Jack Taylor, swimmer (d. 1955)

February

 February 6
 Rip Torn, actor (d. 2019)
 Mamie Van Doren, film actress
 February 8 – James Dean, actor (d. 1955)
 February 9 – Jack Van Impe, televangelist (d. 2020)
 February 11 – Larry Merchant, author and boxing commentator
 February 13 – Geoff Edwards, actor, game show host (d. 2014)
 February 16 – George E. Sangmeister, politician (d. 2007)
 February 18
 Johnny Hart, cartoonist (d. 2007)
 Toni Morrison, African-American novelist, essayist, editor, teacher and professor (d. 2019)
 Bob St. Clair, American football player (d. 2015)
 February 20 – John Milnor, mathematician 
 February 23 – Betty Ray McCain, politician (d. 2022)
 February 24
 James Abourezk, politician (d. 2033)
 Dominic Chianese, actor, singer
 February 28
 Gavin MacLeod, actor, Mayor of Pacific Palisades (d. 2021)
 Dean Smith, basketball player and coach (d. 2015)

March

 March 3
 Paul Clayton, folk singer and folklorist (d. 1967)
 John Smith, actor (d. 1995)
 March 4
 Wally Bruner, journalist and television host (d. 1997)
 Alice Rivlin, born Georgianna Alice Mitchell, American economist (d. 2019)
 March 6 – Carmen de Lavallade, actress, dancer and choreographer  
 March 12 – Herb Kelleher, businessman (d. 2019) 
 March 15
 D. J. Fontana, drummer (d. 2018)
 Ted Marchibroda, American football player (d. 2016) 
 March 18 – Shirley Stovroff, American baseball player (d. 1994)
 March 20
 Norman Francis, American lawyer 
 Hal Linden, American actor, singer (Barney Miller)
 Karen Steele, American actress and model (d. 1988)
 March 22 
 Paul G. Hewitt, American physicist, boxer, uranium prospector, author and cartoonist 
 Burton Richter, American physicist, recipient of the Nobel Prize in Physics in 1976
 March 24 – Connie Hines, American actress (d. 2009)
 March 26 – Leonard Nimoy, American actor and film director (d. 2015)
 March 27 – David Janssen, American actor (d. 1980)

April

 April 5 – Jack Clement, singer-songwriter, record producer (d. 2013)
 April 8 
 John Gavin, actor, diplomat (d. 2018)
 Jack Stallings, baseball head, coach (d. 2018)
 April 10 – James L. Dozier, U.S. Army officer
 April 11 – Johnny Sheffield, child actor (d. 2010)
 April 13 – Dan Gurney, race car driver (d. 2018)
 April 14 – Hugh Leatherman, politician (d. 2021)
 April 18 - Noel Marshall, agent and producer (d. 2010)  
 April 21 - Fred Brooks, computer scientist (d. 2022)
 April 26 – Ted Stanley, businessman and philanthropist (d. 2016)
 April 29 – Don Leo Jonathan, American-Canadian professional wrestler (d. 2018)
 April 30
 Eugene John Gerber, Catholic prelate (d. 2018)
 Peter La Farge, singer, songwriter (d. 1965)

May

 May 2 – Cruz Reynoso, civil rights lawyer and jurist (d. 2021)
 May 6 
Louis Gambaccini, civil servant (d. 2018)
Willie Mays, African-American baseball player
 May 7 
 Teresa Brewer, pop and jazz singer (d. 2007)
 Jerry Chesnut, songwriter (d. 2018)
 May 8 – Bob Clotworthy, American diver (d. 2018)
 May 9 – Don Gardner, American singer-songwriter (d. 2018)
 May 13 – Jim Jones, American People's Temple cult leader (d. 1978)
 May 14 – Alvin Lucier, American composer
 May 15
 Joseph A. Califano, Jr., Chairman of the National Center on Addiction and Substance Abuse
 Ken Venturi, golfer (d. 2013)
 May 16
 Jack Dodson, actor (d. 1994)
 Lowell Weicker, politician
 May 17 
 Stan Albeck, basketball coach (d. 2021)
 Marshall Applewhite, Heaven's Gate religious sect founder (d. 1997)
 May 18
 Don Martin, artist (MAD Magazine) (d. 2000)
 Robert Morse, actor
 George Shapiro, talent manager and television producer (d. 2022)
 May 19 — David Wilkerson, Christian evangelist 
 May 20 – Ken Boyer, baseball player (d. 1982)
 May 23 
 Barbara Barrie, actress 
 Patience Cleveland, actress and diarist (d. 2004)
 May 28 – Carroll Baker, actress
 May 30 – Charles Bowsher, businessman and politician, Comptroller General of the United States (d. 2022)
 May 31
 John Schrieffer, physicist, recipient of the Nobel Prize in Physics in 1972 (d. 2019)
 Shirley Verrett, mezzo-soprano (d. 2010)

June

 June 1 – Hal R. Smith, American baseball player and coach (d. 2014)
 June 2
 William H. Donaldson, American banker and businessman, co-founded Donaldson, Lufkin & Jenrette
 James L. Fisher, American psychologist and academic administrator (d. 2022)
 Larry Jackson, American baseball player and politician (d. 1990)
 June 6 – Ken Knowlton, American computer graphics pioneer (d. 2022)
 June 9
 Jackie Mason, American comedian
 Joe Santos, American actor (d. 2016)
 Bill Virdon, American baseball player (d. 2021)
 June 11 – Paul Hardin III, American academic administrator (d. 2017)
 June 13
 Marla Gibbs, African-American actress, comedian and singer
 Junior Walker, saxophonist, singer (d. 1995)
 June 20 
 Mary L. Good, inorganic chemist (d. 2019) 
 Olympia Dukakis, screen actress (d. 2021)
 June 21 
 Margaret Heckler, Secretary of Health and Human Services (d. 2018)
 Les Vandyke, musician
 June 22 – Martin Lipton, American lawyer 
 June 23 – Doris Cook, American baseball pitcher, outfielder
 June 24
 Billy Casper, golfer (d. 2015)
 Juanita Quigley, child actress (d. 2017)
 June 26
 Robert Colbert, actor
 George Lois, art director, designer and author
 June 28
 Junior Johnson, NASCAR driver of the 1950s and 1960s (d. 2019)
 Tom Stolhandske, American football linebacker
 June 29
 Richard L. Berkley, politician
 Ed Gilbert, actor (d. 1999)
 June 30
 Don Gross, American baseball player (d. 2017)
 Ronald Rene Lagueux, American judge
 Kaye Vaughan, American football player

July

 July 1 – Marilyn Hickey, American televangelist, speaker and author
 July 3
 Ed Roebuck, American Major League Baseball relief pitcher (d. 2018)
 Ray Rogers, American politician (d. 2020)
 July 4
 Rick Casares, American football player and soldier (d. 2013)
 Bobby Malkmus, American Major League Baseball infielder, scout
 Lyndell Petersen, American politician
 July 6
 Robert Dunham, American actor, writer (d. 2001)
 Maralou Gray, American film, television, and theater actress
 Della Reese, African-American actress, singer and evangelist (d. 2017)
 July 7 – J. Joseph Curran Jr., American politician
 July 8
 Lowell N. Lewis, American plant physiology professor
 Zach Monroe, American baseball player
 July 9
 Rodney Anderson, American politician
 Sylvia Bacon, American judge
 Thomas A. Pankok, American Democratic Party politician
 July 10
 Nick Adams, American actor (d. 1968)
 Jerry Herman, American composer, lyricist (d. 2019)
 Julian May, American science fiction, fantasy, horror, and science writer (d. 2017)
 July 11 – Tab Hunter, American actor, singer (d. 2018)
 July 13
 Ernie Colón, American-born Puerto Rico comics artist
 Frank Ramsey, American professional basketball player, coach (d. 2018)
 July 15 
 Clive Cussler, American thriller writer and underwater explorer (d. 2020)
 Joanna Merlin, American actress
 July 16 – Norm Sherry, American Major League Baseball catcher, manager, and coach (d. 2021)
 July 18 – Maury Duncan, American quarterback
 July 19 
 Marilyn Lewis, American politician (d. 2020)
 Mary Lou Studnicka, American female professional baseball player
 July 27 – Jerry Van Dyke, American comedian, actor (d. 2018)
 July 31 
 Nick Bollettieri, American tennis coach (d. 2022)
 Kenny Burrell, American jazz guitarist

August

 August 1 – Hal Connolly, American athlete (d. 2010)
 August 6 – Ron Feiereisel, American basketball player, coach (d. 2000)
 August 7 – Charles E. Rice, American legal scholar, author (d. 2015)
 August 10 – Tom Laughlin, American actor (Billy Jack) (d. 2013)
 August 12 – William Goldman, American author (d. 2018)
 August 13 – William D. Mullins, American politician and baseball player (d. 1986)
 August 14 – Frederic Raphael, American screenwriter, novelist and non-fiction author working in the UK 
 August 15
 Joe Feeney, American singer (d. 2008)
 Richard F. Heck, American chemist, recipient of the Nobel Prize in Chemistry in 2010 (d. 2015)
 Janice Rule, American actress (d. 2003)
 August 16 – William Luce, American writer (d. 2019) 
 August 19 – Willie Shoemaker, American jockey (d. 2003)
 August 20 – Don King, African-American boxing promoter
 August 23
 Barbara Eden, American actress, singer (I Dream of Jeannie)
 Lyle Lahey, American cartoonist (d. 2013)
 Hamilton O. Smith, American microbiologist, recipient of the Nobel Prize in Physiology or Medicine in 1978
 August 25
 Cecil Andrus, American politician
 Hal Fishman, Los Angeles-based American local news anchor (d. 2007)
 Regis Philbin, American television personality (d. 2020) 
 August 27 – Joe Cunningham, American baseball player (d. 2021)
 August 30 – Jack Swigert, American astronaut (d. 1982)
 August 31
 Kenny Burrell, American jazz musician
 Noble Willingham, American actor (d. 2004)

September

 September 1 – Richard Hundley, American pianist, composer (d. 2018)
 September 2 
 Michael Dante, actor 
 Alan K. Simpson, politician
 Ernest E. West, soldier, Medal of Honor recipient (d. 2021)
 September 3 – Tom Brewer, American baseball player (d. 2018)
 September 4 – Mitzi Gaynor, American actress, singer and dancer
 September 10
 Mathew Ahmann, American Catholic civil rights activist (d. 2001)
 Philip Baker Hall, American actor (d. 2022)
 September 11 – John Reger, American football player (d. 2013)
 September 12
 George Jones, American country music singer, songwriter (d. 2013)
 Bill McKinney, American actor (d. 2011)
 September 13 – Barbara Bain, American actress (Mission: Impossible)
 September 16 – Little Willie Littlefield, American R&B pianist and singer (d. 2013)
 September 17 – Anne Bancroft, American actress (d. 2005)
 September 19
 Brook Benton, American singer-songwriter (d. 1988)
 Ray Danton, American actor (d. 1992)
 September 21
 Gertrude Alderfer, American female professional baseball player (d. 2018)
 Gloria Cordes, American female professional baseball player (d. 2018)
 Larry Hagman, American actor, director (Dallas) (d. 2012)
 September 29 – James Watson Cronin, American nuclear physicist, recipient of the Nobel Prize in Physics in 1980 (d. 2016)
 September 30
 Angie Dickinson, American actress 
 Wesley L. Fox, U.S. Marine Corps officer (d. 2017)

October

 October 1 – Alan Wagner, opera critic (d. 2007)
 October 2 – Morris Cerullo, televangelist
 October 3 – Denise Scott Brown, architect
 October 7 – Cotton Fitzsimmons, basketball coach (d. 2004)
 October 13 – Eddie Mathews, baseball player (d. 2001)
 October 15
 Freddy Cole, singer and pianist
 Gail Harris, baseball player and coach (d. 2012)
 October 16
 James Chace, historian (d. 2004)
 Charles Colson, politician, Watergate conspirator, later evangelist (d. 2012)
 October 20 
 Mickey Mantle, baseball player (d. 1995)
 Zeke Bratkowski, American football player (d. 2019)  
 October 22 – Ann Rule, true-crime writer (d. 2015)
 October 23 – Jim Bunning, U.S. Senator from Kentucky from 1999 to 2011 (d. 2017)
 October 26
 Hank Garrett, actor, comedian
 Larry Lieber, comic book artist and writer 
 October 28 – Harold Battiste, composer, arranger (d. 2015)
 October 30
 Dick Gautier, actor (d. 2017)
 Rita Crocker Clements, political organizer (d. 2018)
 October 31
 Jack Molinas, basketball player (d. 1975)
 Dan Rather, television news reporter (CBS Evening News)

November

 November 1 – Jack Morris, American football player (d. 2022)
 November 2 – Phil Woods, saxophonist (d. 2015)
 November 4
 Marie Mansfield, professional baseball player
 Bernard Francis Law, cardinal (d. 2017 in Italy)
 November 5 – Ike Turner, African-American rock musician (d. 2007)
 November 8
 Jack Collom, poet, essayist and poetry teacher (d. 2017)
 Darla Hood, child actress, and singer (d. 1979)
 November 9
 Pascal F. Calogero Jr., judge (d. 2018)
 Whitey Herzog, baseball player
 November 11 – Leslie Parnas, cellist (d. 2022)
 November 12 
 Norman Mineta, politician (d. 2022)
 Mary Louise Wilson, actress, singer
 November 14 – Dolores Crow, politician, legislator (d. 2018)
 November 15 – John Kerr, actor (d. 2013)
 November 16 
 Duane E. Dewey, Medal of Honor recipient (d. 2021)
 Hubert Sumlin, blues musician (d. 2011)
 November 16 – Hubert Sumlin, blues musician (d. 2011)
 November 24 – Tommy Allsup, musician (d. 2017)
 November 30 – Jack Ging, actor (d. 2022)

December

 December 1
 Jimmy Lyons, American musician (d. 1986)
 Jim Nesbitt, American country music singer (d. 2007)
 December 2
 Wynton Kelly, Jamaican-American jazz pianist, composer (d. 1971)
 Edwin Meese, American attorney, law professor, and author
 December 3 
 Jaye P. Morgan, American singer, chanteuse
 Jolene Unsoeld, American politician (d. 2021)
 December 7 – Richard N. Goodwin, American writer (d. 2018)
 December 11 – Benny Spellman, American R&B singer (d. 2011)
 December 16 – Ralph Wolfe Cowan, American portrait artist (d. 2018)
 December 17 – Dave Madden, actor (The Partridge Family) (d. 2014)
 December 18 – Gene Shue, American basketball player and coach (d. 2022)
 December 19 – Bud Clark, American politician and businessman (d. 2022)
 December 20
 Terry Sanders, American film director, producer and screenwriter
 Ike Skelton, American lawyer and politician (d. 2013)
 December 23 – Ronnie Schell, actor
 December 24 – Ray Bryant, jazz pianist, composer, arranger (d. 2011)
 December 27
 Edward E. Hammer, electrical engineer, inventor (d. 2012)
 Scotty Moore, guitarist (d. 2016)
 December 28 – Martin Milner, actor (Adam-12) (d. 2015)
 December 30
 Charles Bassett, American electrical engineer, astronaut (d. 1966)
 Skeeter Davis, American country singer (d. 2004)

Deaths
 January 4
 Art Acord, actor (born 1890)
 Roger Connor, baseball player and MLB Hall of Famer (born 1857)
 January 12 – Anna Manning Comfort, physician (born 1845)
 January 14 – Hardy Richardson, baseball player (born 1855)
 January 21 – Alma Rubens, actress (born 1897)
 January 31 – Zina P. Young Card, Mormon leader and women's rights activist (born 1850)
 February 14 – Clarence Ransom Edwards, army officer (born 1859)
 February 18 – Louis Wolheim, actor (born 1880)
 February 28 
Laton Alton Huffman, photographer of the American frontier and Native American life (born 1854)
Thomas S. Rodgers, admiral (born 1858)
 March 20 – Joseph B. Murdock, United States Navy admiral and New Hampshire politician (born 1851)
 March 24 – Robert Edeson, actor (born 1868)
 March 25 – Ida Wells, African-American lynching crusader (born 1862)
 March 28 – Ban Johnson, baseball executive (born 1864)
 March 31 – Knute Rockne, football coach (born 1888)
 April 1 – Macklyn Arbuckle, actor (born 1866)
 April 9 – Nicholas Longworth, politician, Speaker of the House (born 1869)
 April 17 – Ernesto Rossi, racketeer (born 1903)
 April 26 – George Herbert Mead, philosopher (born 1863)
 May 2 – George Fisher Baker, financier and philanthropist (born 1840)
 May 14 – David Belasco, Broadway impresario, theater owner and playwright (born 1853)
 June 2 – Joseph W. Farnham, screenwriter (born 1884)
 July 5 – Arthur Starr Eakle, mineralogist (born 1862)
 July 24 – George Arthur Boeckling, businessman, president of Cedar Point Pleasure Company (born 1862)
 August 6 – Bix Beiderbecke, jazz trumpeter (born 1903)
 August 27 – Francis Marion Smith, businessman (born 1846)
 August 29 – David T. Abercrombie, businessman, co-founder of Abercrombie & Fitch (born 1867) 
 September 6 – Juliana Walanika, the "Hawaiian Nightingale", court singer (born 1846 in the Kingdom of Hawaii)
 September 17 – Marvin Hart, World Heavyweight Boxing Champion (born 1876)
 September 19 – David Starr Jordan, ichthyologist, educator, eugenicist, and peace activist (born 1851)
 September 30 – Jane Meade Welch, historian (born 1854)
 October 6 
 Carrie Babcock Sherman, Second Lady of the United States as wife of James S. Sherman (born 1856)
 Albert M. Todd, businessman and politician (born 1850)
 October 7 – Daniel Chester French, sculptor (born 1850)
 October 18 – Thomas Edison, inventor (born 1847)
 October 26 – Charles Comiskey, baseball owner (born 1859)
 October 31 – Charles E. Rushmore, businessman, attorney, namesake of Mount Rushmore (born in 1857)
 November 4 – Buddy Bolden, African American musician (born 1877)
 November 6 – Jack Chesbro, baseball player and MLB Hall of Famer (born 1874)
 December 5 – Vachel Lindsay, poet (born 1879)
 December 18 – Jack Diamond, gangster (born 1897)
 December 23 – Tyrone Power, Sr., actor (born 1869)
 December 26 – Melvil Dewey, librarian, inventor of Dewey Decimal Classification (born 1851)

See also
 List of American films of 1931
 Timeline of United States history (1930–1949)

References

External links
 

 
1930s in the United States
United States
United States
Years of the 20th century in the United States